The 1947 New York Cubans were a baseball team that competed in Negro league baseball during the 1947 baseball season.  The team compiled a 46–23–1 record and won the 1947 Negro World Series, defeating the Cleveland Buckeyes four games to one.

José María Fernández was the team's manager. Shortstop Silvio Garcia and third baseman Minnie Miñoso were the team's leading hitters. Luis Tiant, Sr. and Lino Donoso were the leading pitchers.

Jackie Robinson became the first African-American to play in Major League Baseball in 1947. Several players from the 1947 Cubans also went on to play in the majors, including Miñoso in 1949 and Donoso in 1955.

Statistics

Batting 
Note: Pos = Position; G = Games played; AB = At bats; H = Hits; Avg. = Batting average; HR = Home runs; SLG = Slugging percentage

Pitching 
Note: G = Games; IP = Innings pitched; W = Wins; L = Losses; PCT = Win percentage; ERA = Earned run average; SO = Strikeouts

References

1947 in sports in New York City
New York Cubans
Negro league baseball seasons